The Palmetto Building, built during 1912–1913, is an early skyscraper in Columbia, South Carolina.  It was designed by architect Julius Harder, and Wilson and Sompayrac served as supervising architects.  Upon completion it was the tallest building in South Carolina.

The Palmetto Building was listed on the National Register of Historic Places in 1980. Since the mid-2000s, it has housed the Sheraton Columbia Downtown Hotel.

It was important in the architectural career of Charles Coker Wilson, establishing his credentials for steel frame skyscraper construction.

See also 
 List of tallest buildings in Columbia, South Carolina

References

External links

Historic American Buildings Survey in South Carolina
Office buildings on the National Register of Historic Places in South Carolina
Buildings and structures in Richland County, South Carolina
National Register of Historic Places in Columbia, South Carolina
1913 establishments in South Carolina
Skyscrapers in South Carolina
Skyscraper office buildings in South Carolina
Office buildings completed in 1913